Piano Concerto No. 3 in C-sharp minor, Op. 55, by German composer Ferdinand Ries was written around 1813. It was composed in the proto-Romantic style, similar to the concertos of Johann Nepomuk Hummel, and anticipates stylistic developments of future Romantic composers.

History
The manuscript bears the notation "St. Petersburg 1812", suggesting it was begun there . In any case, it was probably  begun in 1812 and finished later, and most likely the fifth of Ries's eight piano concertos to be written.

The concerto was not published until 1815, when it was published by N. Simrock in Bonn with a dedication to Muzio Clementi.

Connection to Franz Liszt
This piece, according to the diary of Adam Liszt, father of Franz Liszt, was the piano piece being played by Adam which "completely absorbed" Franz in his "sixth year"; following this he incessantly begged to be taught the piano.

Movements
This work follows the traditional three-movement structure:
Allegro maestoso 
Larghetto – (attacca) 
Rondo: Allegretto 

The first movement bears a strong resemblance to the music of period composers such as J. N. Hummel, John Field, or Friedrich Kalkbrenner. The second theme is in A-flat major (the dominant major enharmonic to G-sharp) rather than the expected E major. The second movement, in A major, anticipates the stylistic idiom of the music of Frédéric Chopin.  The third movement, a fast 2/4, begins deceptively in C-sharp major, but actually its home key is in C-sharp minor, in which key the movement (and the work) ends.

Recordings

Notable recordings of this composition include:

References
Notes

Sources

External links
 

03
1813 compositions
Compositions in C-sharp minor
Music with dedications